Coprosma prisca, commonly known as goatwood, is a flowering plant in the family Rubiaceae. The Latin specific epithet prisca means “old” or “ancient”, though its application to this species is unknown.

Description
It is a dense shrub growing to 3 m in height. The glossy, bright green, obovate to elliptic leaves are 20–70 mm long, 35 mm wide, with slightly recurved edges. The flowers are small and green, 6–8 mm long. The egg-shaped green fruits are 6–7 mm long. The flowering season is from late August to early October.

Distribution and habitat
The species is endemic to Australia’s subtropical Lord Howe Island in the Tasman Sea. It is common at low elevations along the coast.

References

prisca
Endemic flora of Lord Howe Island
Plants described in 1917
Gentianales of Australia
Taxa named by Walter Oliver